Leophanes or Leo'phanes or Leophanēs was an Ancient Greek scientist and naturalist who lived approximately between 470-430 BC and the 4th century BC.  He is known from mentions in Aristotle and Pseudo-Plutarch, both of whom discuss his theory that male and female animals are generated from different testicles.

References 

Greek naturalists
Ancient Greek scientists
5th-century BC Greek people
4th-century BC Greek people